This article shows the roster of all participating teams at the 2018 FIVB Volleyball Women's Nations League. The 16 national teams involved in the tournament were required to register a squad of 21 players, which every week's 14-player roster must be selected from. Each country must declare its 14-player roster two days before the start of each week's round-robin competition.

A preliminary squad with 26 names was announced on 26 April 2018.

Head coach: Guillermo Orduna

Head coach: Gert Vande Broek

A preliminary squad with 26 names was announced on 24 April 2018.

Head coach: José Roberto Guimarães

A preliminary squad with 26 names was announced on 24 April 2018.

Head coach: Lang Ping

Head coach:  Marcos Kwiek

A preliminary squad with 26 names was announced on 26 April 2018.

Head coach: Felix Koslowski

Head coach: Davide Mazzanti

Head coach: Kumi Nakada

Head coach:  Jamie Morrison

A preliminary squad with 27 names was announced on 19 April 2018.

Head coach: Jacek Nawrocki

Head coach: Vadim Pankov

Head coach: Zoran Terzić

The final squad was announced on 20 April 2018.

Head coach: Cha Hae-won

A preliminary squad with 26 names was announced on 26 April 2018.

Head coach: Danai Sriwatcharamethakul

Head coach:  Giovanni Guidetti

A preliminary squad with 26 names was announced on 19 April 2018.

Head coach: Karch Kiraly

References

External links
Official website

2018
2018 in women's volleyball